Clypeoporthe iliau is a plant pathogen.

Hosts 
Hosts include sugarcane (Saccharum spp.).

References

External links 
 Index Fungorum
 USDA ARS Fungal Database

Fungal plant pathogens and diseases
Gnomoniaceae
Fungi described in 1978